Eleonora Vera Sipos (7 September 1900– 5 August 1988) was a notable New Zealand businesswoman, humanitarian and welfare worker. She was born in Cernovice, Bohemia in 1900, but known in New Zealand as Nora Sipos.

References

1900 births
1988 deaths
New Zealand women in business
Croatian emigrants to New Zealand